Events from the year 1735 in art.

Events
 The Chandos Mausoleum is constructed for James Brydges, 1st Duke of Chandos.
 Charles-Joseph Natoire carries out the first of his tapestry cartoons for the series History of Don Quixote.
 Guillaume Coustou the Younger is awarded the Prix de Rome.
 The ballad opera called Flora, or Hob in the Well went down in recorded history as the first opera of any kind to be produced in North America. (Feb 18, 1735 in Charleston, S.C.)

Paintings

 Jacopo Amigoni
 Caroline Wilhelmina of Brandenburg-Ansbach
 Frederick, Prince of Wales
 Canaletto
 The Bucintoro Returning to the Molo (1730–1735) (Bowes Museum, Barnard Castle, England)
 The Molo, Venice (approximate date) (Kimbell Art Museum, Fort Worth, Texas)
 A Regatta on the Grand Canal (1730–1735) (Bowes Museum, Barnard Castle, England)
 Venice: A Regatta on the Grand Canal (National Gallery, London)
 View of the Piazzetta San Marco Looking South (approximate date) (Indianapolis Museum of Art)
 Jean-Baptiste-Siméon Chardin
 Boy building a House of Cards (probable first version; Waddesdon Manor, England)
 Boy with a Top
 A Lady Taking Tea
 Charles-Joseph Natoire – Psyche and Proserpine
 Giovanni Battista Piazzetta – The Assumption of Mary (The Louvre)

Sculptures

 Unknown sculptor - Equestrian statue of William III, Glasgow

Births
 January 18 – Jeremiah Meyer, English miniaturist (died 1789)
 May – Dmitry Levitzky, Russian-Ukrainian portrait painter (died 1822)
 May 8 – Sir Nathaniel Dance-Holland, English portrait painter and later a politician (died 1811)
 June 16 – Nicolas Bernard Lépicié, French painter (died 1784)
 July 10 – Ulrika Pasch, Swedish miniaturist (died 1796)
 October 17 – Franz Xaver Feuchtmayer the Younger, member of the German Feuchtmayer family of Baroque artists associated with the Wessobrunner School (died 1803)
 December 20 – Friedrich August Brand, Austrian painter and engraver of historical subjects and landscapes (died 1806)
 December 29 – Thomas Banks, sculptor (died 1805)
 date unknown
 Dimitrije Bačević, Serbian icon painter and muralist(died 1770)
 Samuel Collins, British miniature painter (died 1768)
 Tilly Kettle, English portrait painter (died 1786)
 Isoda Koryusai, Japanese printmaker and painter (died 1790)
 Étienne de La Vallée Poussin, French history painter and creator of interior decorative schemes (died 1802)
 James Tassie, Scottish engraver (died 1799)
 Giovanni Volpato, Italian engraver, excavator, dealer in antiquities and manufacturer of biscuit porcelain figurines (died 1803)

Deaths
 January 21 – Abraham Rademaker, Dutch painter and printmaker (born 1677)
 July 1 – Jean Ranc, French portrait painter (born 1674)
 July 16 – Cassandra Willoughby, Duchess of Chandos, British historian, travel writer and artist (born 1670)
 December 11 – Antoine Rivalz, official painter to the town of Toulouse (born 1667)
 date unknown
 Pompeo Aldrovandini, Italian painter (born 1677)
 Antonio Beduzzi, Austrian-Italian theater engineer, painter, and architect (born 1675)
 Antonio Dardani, Italian painter (born 1677)
 Nunzio Ferraiuoli, Italian painter (born 1661)
 Pârvu Mutul, Romanian muralist and church painter (born 1657)
 Giacomo Antonio Ponsonelli, Italian Rococo sculptor (born 1654)

References

 
Years of the 18th century in art
1730s in art